LaTour is the debut album by house music songwriter/producer LaTour.  Released in 1991, it featured the hit single "People Are Still Having Sex". In the album edit of the song, the lyric was originally written as "This AIDS thing's not working".  It was changed to "This safe thing's not working" for airplay.  It reached a peak of 35 on the pop charts, while peaking at number one on the dance charts and number 15 on the UK charts.

Critical reception
Dave Obee from Calgary Herald wrote, "What's this? "Lust keeps on lurking. This AIDS thing's not working"? Can we say that on the radio? Maybe not. We'd better head to the dance clubs, where the song "People Are Still Having Sex" would come as no surprise. You might even get to hear some of LaTour's other songs, such as "Allen's Got a New Hi-Fi". Yes, it's dance music, with all the programming and sampling you can stand. But this electro-pop marvel offers much more - namely, catchy hooks highlighting lyrics that are, to say the least, interesting. Sure, the singing is decadent - but it's also, somehow, full of life. Just remember: Even though you can't see or hear them, somebody in the world is having sex right now." 

Brenda Herrmann from Chicago Tribune said, "Early-'80s influences are obvious, but the album is surprisingly cohesive, with the two best songs being the dance hit "People Are Still Having Sex" and the rough "Allan's Got a New Hi-Fi." Others like "Fantasy Soldiers" and "Cold" are also good for dancing or just listening." Marisa Fox from Entertainment Weekly viewed it as "an album of techno-dance tracks that all sound alike. Machine-driven beats blend together blandly, and LaTour’s factual narratives and occasional bursts into song offer little variation in texture."

Track listing

Original album
All Songs Written By LaTour.
Allen's Got a New Hi-Fi 4:21
People Are Still Having Sex 5:31
Involved 3:27
Cold 5:52
Fantasy Soldiers 3:12
Amazing You 4:24
Laurie Monster 3:58
Psych 4:25
Dark Sunglasses 3:28
Blue 7:37

Extended remixes
Allen's Got a Brand New Hi-Fi 5:03
People Are Still Having Sex 7:10

Production
Executive Producer: Marvin Gleicher
Produced By LaTour & Mark Picchotti
Engineers: Bill Rascati, Dave Sears, Steve Spapperi
Mastering: Ted Jensen

Personnel
LaTour - vocals, keyboards, synthesizers, samples, drum programming
Mark Picchotti - samples, drum programming

Notes

References
Original Lyric for "People Are Still Having Sex" at http://artists.letssingit.com/latour-lyrics-people-are-still-having-sex-41fmqhl

1991 albums
Polydor Records albums